The 2019–20 Liberty Flames men's basketball team represented Liberty University in the 2019–20 NCAA Division I men's basketball season. The team played its home games in Lynchburg, Virginia for the 30th consecutive and final season at Vines Center, with a capacity of 8,085. The team was led by Ritchie McKay, who is in his seventh season, but fifth season since his return to the program. They are second-year members of the ASUN Conference.

Previous season
The Flames finished the 2018–19 season 29–7, 14–2 in ASUN play to finish in second place in their second season in the ASUN. They defeated Jacksonville, North Florida, and Lipscomb in the championship game to win the ASUN tournament. As a result, the Flames received the conference's automatic bid to the NCAA tournament as the No. 12 seed in the East bracket, the school's fourth NCAA Tournament bid. They defeated No. 5-seed Mississippi State in the first round before losing to No. 4-seed Virginia Tech in the second round. This marked Liberty's highest seeding in the NCAA tournament and its first March Madness victory in school history.

Departures

2019-20 Newcomers

Roster

Roster is subject to change as/if players transfer or leave the program for other reasons.

Schedule and results

|-
!colspan=12 style=|Non-conference regular season

|-
!colspan=9 style=| Atlantic Sun Conference regular season

|-
!colspan=12 style=|Atlantic Sun Conference tournament
|-

References

Liberty Flames basketball seasons
Liberty
Liberty Flames basketball team
Liberty Flames basketball team